The 1993–94 NBA season was the Warriors' 48th season in the National Basketball Association, and their 31st in the San Francisco Bay Area. In the 1993 NBA draft, the Warriors selected Penny Hardaway from the University of Memphis with the third overall pick, but soon traded him to the Orlando Magic in exchange for top draft pick Chris Webber from the University of Michigan. During the off-season, the team signed free agent Avery Johnson. Without All-Star guard Tim Hardaway and sixth man Šarūnas Marčiulionis, who both missed the entire season with knee injuries, and with Chris Mullin missing the first 20 games with a finger injury, the Warriors struggled losing three of their first four games, but soon recovered later holding a 27–20 record at the All-Star break. The team improved over the previous season as they posted an 8-game winning streak in April, finishing third in the Pacific Division with a solid 50–32 record.

Webber averaged 17.5 points, 9.1 rebounds and 2.2. blocks per game, and was named Rookie of the Year, and was also named to the NBA All-Rookie First Team, while second-year star Latrell Sprewell averaged 21.0 points, 4.7 assists and 2.2 steals per game, and was named to the All-NBA First Team, NBA All-Defensive Second Team, and was selected for the 1994 NBA All-Star Game. In addition, Mullin played half of the season off the bench, averaging 16.8 points and 5.6 rebounds per game, while Billy Owens provided the team with 15.0 points and 8.1 rebounds per game, and Johnson contributed 10.9 points and 5.3 assists per game. Sprewell also finished in second place in Most Improved Player voting.

However, in the Western Conference First Round of the playoffs, the Warriors were swept by the Phoenix Suns in three straight games. This would be their final playoff appearance until 2007. 

Following the season, Marčiulionis and second-year forward Byron Houston were both traded to the Seattle SuperSonics, and Johnson re-signed as a free agent with his former team, the San Antonio Spurs.

Offseason

Draft picks

Roster

Roster Notes
 Point guard Tim Hardaway, and shooting guard Šarūnas Marčiulionis both missed the entire season due to knee injuries.

Regular season

Season standings

z - clinched division title
y - clinched division title
x - clinched playoff spot

Record vs. opponents

Game log

Playoffs

Game log

|- style="background:#fbb;"
| 1
| April 29
| @ Phoenix
| L 104–111
| Billy Owens (27)
| Billy Owens (17)
| Latrell Sprewell (10)
| America West Arena19,023
| 0–1
|- style="background:#fbb;"
| 2
| May 1
| @ Phoenix
| L 111–117
| Chris Mullin (32)
| Chris Webber (10)
| Chris Webber (9)
| America West Arena19,023
| 0–2
|- style="background:#fbb;"
| 3
| May 4
| Phoenix
| L 133–140
| Chris Mullin (30)
| Webber, Gatling (8)
| Chris Webber (13)
| Oakland-Alameda County Coliseum Arena15,025
| 0–3
|-
|}
|-
! 1994 playoff schedule
|}

Player statistics

Season

Playoffs

Awards and records
 Chris Webber - Rookie of the Year, Player of the Week (Jan. 9), NBA All-Rookie First Team
 Latrell Sprewell - League Leader (Mins. Played, MPG), All-NBA First Team, NBA All-Defensive Second Team, NBA All-Star

Transactions

References

See also
 1993-94 NBA season

Golden State Warriors seasons
Golden
Golden
Golden State